commonly abbreviated as Nintendo IRD, was a Japanese developments division that handled everything related to producing Nintendo's console hardware and associated peripherals. Originally established in the 1970s with engineer Genyo Takeda acting as manager, Nintendo Research & Development No. 3 Department and part of the Manufacturing Division, the department was responsible for various hardware technologies and even developed several arcade and console titles. In 2000, as technology evolved into the 3D era, Takeda's group spun-off and established itself as a division into Integrated Research & Development Division, and began spending longer periods of time researching and testing the various and rapidly evolving hardware that would power Nintendo's next generation of consoles.

The Nintendo IRD Division was broken up into two departments: the Integrated Research & Development Department (or IRD), which focused on the development of Nintendo home video game console hardware and associated peripherals, and the Research & Engineering Development Department (or RED), which focused on the development of Nintendo handheld video game console hardware and associated peripherals. Both departments were split into several sub-groups. Unlike the software departments, the hardware groups generally worked together on most projects.

On February 16, 2013,  Nintendo announced that the Nintendo Research & Engineering Department (or RED), the former hardware group specialized in all engineering and technological aspects of Nintendo's handheld development, was absorbed into Nintendo IRD Division. On September 16, 2015, IRD merged with the Nintendo System Development division, becoming the Nintendo Platform Technology Development.

History 
In December 1980, Genyo Takeda was promoted to manager of the Nintendo R&D3 department.

Hardware developed 
General Manager: Genyo Takeda

The Integrated Research & Development Department (or IRD) was the hardware development team responsible for all of Nintendo's home video game consoles and associated peripherals. The department was split into five different groups who worked together on most projects, with each group generally focusing on a different aspect of product design. The manager, Genyo Takeda, and most of the chief engineers originated from the Nintendo R&D3 hardware division.

Notes

References

Nintendo divisions and subsidiaries
Video game companies established in 1982
Video game companies disestablished in 2015
Defunct video game companies of Japan
Japanese companies disestablished in 2015
Japanese companies established in 1982